Shadows and Light may refer to:

 Shadows and Light (Charlie Major album), a 2006 album by Charlie Major
 Shadows and Light (Joni Mitchell album), a 1980 live album and concert film by Joni Mitchell
 Shadows and Light (Wilson Phillips album), a 1992 album by Wilson Phillips
 "Shadows and Light / The Truth Hurts", an episode of the animated series Yin Yang Yo!
 "Shadows and Light", a story from the Star Wars Tales comic-book series, collected in Star Wars Tales Volume 6

See also
Light and Shadows, an album by Casiopea